The Sultan Abdul Halim Muadzam Shah Bridge or Penang Second Bridge  ( or ) is a dual carriageway toll bridge in Penang, Malaysia. It connects Bandar Cassia (Batu Kawan) in Seberang Perai on mainland Peninsular Malaysia with Batu Maung on Penang Island. It is the second bridge to link the island to the mainland after the first Penang Bridge.

China Harbour Engineering Co Ltd (CHEC), a main contractor for the second bridge was expected to start work on the second Penang bridge in November 2007 and complete the project in 2011, but the completion date was then postponed to May 2012, and later to February 2014.

Construction started in November 2008. To reduce the cost of construction, its design was then modified to resemble the first cable stayed Penang Bridge. The bridge has been built with a large loan from the People's Republic of China to continue and maintain the economic relationship between China and Malaysia. The bridge was officially opened on 1 March 2014 at 20:30 MST and was named after the fourteenth Yang di-Pertuan Agong, the late Tuanku Abdul Halim Muadzam Shah of Kedah and was assigned with the route number E28.

Overview
The Sultan Abdul Halim Muadzam Shah Bridge is a High Impact Project (HIP) launched under the Ninth Malaysia Plan. Being a High Impact Project, it is seen as a key catalyst in the socio-economic development of the Northern Corridor Economic Region (NCER) of Malaysia.
The project is being delivered by a special purpose Concession Company formed by the Government of Malaysia, Jambatan Kedua Sdn Bhd (JKSB). The bridge measuring a total of 24 km in length is being constructed by UEM Builders Sdn Bhd, a subsidiary of the UEM Group Malaysia, as well as China Harbour Engineering Company (CHEC), a subsidiary of the China Communications Construction Company (CCCC). Construction of the bridge, linking Batu Kawan on the mainland and Batu Maung on Penang Island, began in November 2008 and is projected completed in February 2014. The bridge was opened to traffic on 2 March 2014.

Route background

The E28 expressway consists of the bridge and a land expressway linking the bridge to the North–South Expressway Northern Route E1, the main expressway of Peninsular Malaysia.

The Kilometre Zero of the expressway is located at its interchange with the North–South Expressway Northern Route E1. The westbound lanes towards the bridge feature a collector-express lanes system, where the collector lanes have an interchange at Exit 2801 to Bandar Cassia and Batu Kawan while the express lanes continue uninterrupted to the bridge. The bridge and expressway end in Batu Maung on Penang Island at the interchange with Tun Dr Lim Chong Eu Expressway.

History

Planning
The idea to build a second bridge linking Seberang Perai to Penang Island was suggested in 1995 by the fourth Prime Minister of Malaysia's Tun Dr Mahathir Mohamad and the 3rd Chief Minister of Penang's Tan Sri Dr Koh Tsu Koon. In August 2006, the Malaysian federal government unveiled a plan to build the Penang Second Bridge in the Ninth Malaysia Plan. On 12 November 2006, the groundbreaking ceremony for the new Penang Second Bridge was performed by the 5th Malaysian Prime Minister, Abdullah Ahmad Badawi.

Construction
After months of soil survey work and test piling work, CHEC and UEM announced that the project was on track for completion in 2011. Construction work was expected to begin in January 2008.

In April 2008, the government announced that the project was to be delayed by 9 months due to land acquisition, design issues, and also the rising costs of building materials. Newly elected Penang Chief Minister, Lim Guan Eng proposed a toll discount for any delays on the project and also expressed disappointment regarding the construction delay.

In July 2008, Jelutong MP Jeff Ooi reported that the loan for the bridge risked being withdrawn if the shareholder agreement between UEM Builders Berhad and its joint-venture partner CHEC was not inked by August 2008. It was reported that there were disagreements between the two parties on the apportionment of the cost of building the bridge although the issue was expected to be resolved quickly due to UEM having a variation on the price on its portion.

On 8 November 2008, the construction of the Penang Second Bridge by CHEC finally commenced.

On 3 October 2012, media reports indicated that the bridge was 84% complete, and that the bridge was due to be completed approximately two months ahead of the deadline of September 2013.

On 20 April 2013, the final closure of the cable stayed bridge at the main navigational span of the Penang Second Bridge was completed and thus signified the completion of the construction of the bridge and physically connecting Batu Maung on the Island and Batu Kawan on the Mainland.

On 30 April 2013, the sixth Prime Minister Najib Tun Razak became the country's first leader to use the 24 km Penang Second Bridge to cross from the island to the mainland to attend a function in Kepala Batas, Seberang Perai.

The bridge had been planned for completion on 8 November 2013 and to be opened to the public by the end of November. However, the opening day of 8 November 2013 was postponed and the bridge would be opened to traffic on 1 March 2014.

Opening
The opening ceremony of the Penang Second Bridge was held at 20:30 MST on 1 March 2014 and was officially opened by the Malaysian Prime Minister, Najib Tun Razak. The bridge was official named as Sultan Abdul Halim Muadzam Shah Bridge after the fourteenth Yang di-Pertuan Agong, the late Tuanku Abdul Halim Muadzam Shah of Kedah. At midnight on 2 March 2014, the bridge was opened to traffic at 00:01 MST after the official opening ceremony.

Incidents
As with most bridges, the bridge has also been subject to a number of road accidents and suicides.

Penang Second Bridge ramp collapse
On 6 June 2013, a ramp leading to the still under construction Penang Second Bridge at Batu Maung interchange collapsed at around 7:00 pm, burying a car and two motorcycles under the debris. One person was killed in the incident. The ramp which is part of the Package 3A of the bridge project was built by the contractor Cergas Murni Sdn Bhd and not UEM Builders Berhad.

Design specifications

Bridge
The Sultan Abdul Halim Muadzam Shah Bridge is designed based on the double "S" curvy concept due to the geological reasons.The numerous "S"-like curves along the 24 km stretch are a requirement under the Road Safety Audit. 

The Sultan Abdul Halim Muadzam Shah Bridge is the longest bridge in the world installed with High Damping Natural Rubber (HDNR) Bearing, an effective seismic isolation system that enables the bridge to withstand high intensity earthquakes. The bridge is the first in Malaysia to be installed with seismic expansion joints, which will allow movements during an earthquake.

Bridge specifications
 Overall length: 
 Length over water: 
 Main span: Length – 250 m
 Height clearance (above water): 30 m
 Number of vehicle lanes: 2 (with road shoulder) + 1 for motorcycles (each direction)
 Targeted date to be opened to the public: 2 March 2014
 Overall cost: RM 4.5 Billion
 Average time taken to drive from Batu Kawan to Batu Maung: 20 mins
 Proposed speed limit on bridge: 80 km/h (50 mph)
 Percentage of local contents to be used: 60%

Land expressway
The land expressway is the first in Malaysia to be designed based on an upgraded secondary consolidation criterion of 50mm settlement in the next 20 years.

Tolls

Overview
The bridge and the link road to the North–South Expressway are maintained by a private concession company, Jambatan Kedua Sdn Bhd (JKSB). The toll for the bridge is similar to the toll scheme for the Penang Bridge, where a fee is collected one way when crossing the bridge from the mainland to Penang Island, while no fee is imposed for mainland-bound motorists coming from the island. On the other hand, the toll for the link road between the bridge and the North–South Expressway is collected in both directions.

There was a toll-free trial period during the opening month from 2 March until 31 March 2014. Toll collection began on 1 April 2014 at 6am. Toll for motorcyclists was abolished from 1 January 2019.

There are two toll plazas on the route: the Penang Second Bridge Integrated Toll Plaza (Bandar Cassia PLUS Toll Plaza) and the Penang Second Bridge Toll Plaza (JK2PP Toll Plaza).

Penang Second Bridge Integrated Toll Plaza (Bandar Cassia PLUS Toll Plaza)
The Penang Second Bridge Integrated Toll Plaza or Bandar Cassia PLUS Toll Plaza, also known as Gateway Arch Toll Plaza after its gateway arch design, is the main toll plaza for Sultan Abdul Halim Muadzam Shah Bridge. Upon completion in February 2014, it is the largest toll plaza in Malaysia, overtaking the Sungai Besi Toll Plaza of the North–South Expressway Southern Route E2. The toll plaza is Malaysia's longest non-vehicular span steel arch structure. It is also the first in Malaysia to be awarded with a Platinum rating in the Green Building Index (GBI).

Situated between the North–South Expressway (Exit 157) and Bandar Cassia (Exit 2801) interchanges, the Bandar Cassia PLUS Toll Plaza is managed by PLUS Expressways, the highway concessionaire of the North–South Expressway.

In the westbound direction towards the bridge, the toll plaza is the starting point of the collector-express lanes system with division into two sections: Plaza A for the express lanes to the bridge and Plaza B for the collector lanes to the Bandar Cassia interchange. At Plaza A, three tolls are collected from motorists: the PLUS closed toll collection for the North–South Expressway, the toll for the link road and the toll for the bridge; the latter two are collected on behalf of JKSB. At Plaza B, only the first two tolls are collected without the bridge component, as it is intended for motorists heading towards Bandar Cassia and Batu Kawan without using the bridge. Motorcyclists are not charged any tolls, instead using the motorcycle lane on the collector lanes' side to bypass the toll plaza.

In the eastbound direction towards the North–South Expressway, the toll plaza serves as the entry point into the PLUS closed toll system. The toll for the link road is collected together with the PLUS closed toll when the motorist exits the closed toll system.

Penang Second Bridge Toll Plaza (JK2PP Toll Plaza)

The Penang Second Bridge Toll Plaza or JK2PP Toll Plaza is located on the collector lanes after the Bandar Cassia interchange (Exit 2801), before merging with the express lanes towards the bridge. The toll plaza is managed by Jambatan Kedua Sdn Bhd (JKSB).

The toll for the bridge is collected from motorists going towards the bridge from the Bandar Cassia interchange, as well as from those who had used Plaza B at the Bandar Cassia PLUS Toll Plaza and travelled on the collector lanes to the bridge. Motorists travelling on the express lanes bypass the JK2PP Toll Plaza, as they had already paid the toll for the bridge at Plaza A of the Bandar Cassia PLUS Toll Plaza.

Toll rates

Penang Second Bridge Integrated Toll Plaza (Bandar Cassia PLUS Toll Plaza)
The toll rates in the table are for the link road only. The toll is collected in conjunction with other tolls (toll for the North–South Expressway and/or toll for the bridge, depending on travel direction and the plaza section used).

Beginning 26 April 2017, only Touch 'n Go and SmartTAG is accepted for toll payment. PLUS transit ticket is no longer issued for entry at Bandar Cassia toll plaza.

Penang Second Bridge Toll Plaza (JK2PP Toll Plaza) (For Bandar Cassia Interchange–Penang Second Bridge bound only)
Since 1 June 2016, all electronic toll transactions have been conducted using Touch 'n Go and SmartTAG. The SmartTAG lane is for light vehicles only. Cash payment is not accepted.

Facilities

JKSB Ronda
JKSB Ronda is the highway patrol unit to patrol along the Sultan Abdul Halim Muadzam Shah Bridge and land expressways and also to provide assistance to commuters on the bridge. The current highway patrol vehicles are the Japanese made Toyota Hilux and the Mitsubishi i-MiEV, the four-seater electric vehicle, with similar dimensions of a Perodua Viva, is able to travel 150 km after an eight-hour full charge. Seven charging stations were also set up at the toll plaza on the mainland, two of them being rapid chargers which are able to give an 80 percent charge in 30 minutes.

Inventory

Rest and service areas (R&R)
The future two rest and service areas (R&R) is located at Batu Kawan on the mainland. It will be built in six months' time. The plan had been the floating rest and service area on the middle of the bridge. However, the plan was scrapped due to high cost.

List of interchanges

Major Routes

Lebuhraya Bandar Cassia

Lebuhraya Bandar Cassia is a major road in Penang, Malaysia.

List of interchange

Major events

 JKSB Ride

Facts and figures

 Sultan Abdul Halim Muadzam Shah Bridge is the longest bridge in Malaysia and second longest in Southeast Asia, after Temburong Bridge. It was listed into the Malaysian Book of Records.
 Penang Second Bridge Integrated Toll Plaza or Gateway Arch Toll Plaza is the largest toll plaza in Malaysia. It was listed into the Malaysian Book of Records.
 The longest bridge over the water in Malaysia and Southeast Asia at 16.9 km.
 The longest bridge in Malaysia installed with High Damping Natural Rubber Bearing (HDNRB) that provides effective seismic isolation system that enables the bridge to withstand high intensity earthquakes.
 The bridge's 2.3 meter diameter bore pile designed for the Main Span bored 127 meter deep is among the deepest in the world.
 The Statnamic load test conducted at Pier 24 was the biggest Statnamic load test ever conducted in the world at 54MN.
 The first bridge to deploy electric vehicles as its Patrol Vehicle for the bridge and land expressway.
 Sultan Abdul Halim Mu’adzam Shah Bridge Toll Plaza Complex (Gateway Arch Toll Plaza) is the first in Malaysia to be awarded with a Platinum rating for the Green Building Index (GBI).
 The land expressway is the first in Malaysia to be designed for upgraded secondary consolidation criteria at 50mm settlement in 20 years.
 The first bridge in Malaysia installed with seismic expansion joints.
 First bridge in Malaysia installed with noise reduction seismic expansion joints.
 Malaysia's first third generation saddles at Pylon 25 & 26 for Main Span Stayed Cable Bridge.
 Largest Toll Plaza Complex in Malaysia installed with Ethylene Tetrfluoroethylene (ETFE) as its roof canopy (Jambatan Sultan Abdul Halim Mu’adzam Shah Integrated Toll Plaza / Bandar Cassia PLUS Toll Plaza).
 Malaysia's longest pre-joined precast spun concrete piles were driven in the construction of this project.
 The first bridge in Malaysia to use the TL-4 movable barrier at the median crossing (every 2 km interval), which can stand impact from trucks, busses or other heavy vehicles.
 Installation of Dynamic Road Signage, which allow road users to access real time traffic conditions on the first bridge and Jambatan Sultan Abdul Halim Mu’adzam Shah. The first of such system installed in Malaysia.
 Sultan Abdul Halim Mu’adzam Shah Bridge Integrated Toll Plaza / Bandar Cassia PLUS Toll Plaza is Malaysia's largest non-vehicular span steel arch structure erected, greeting the road users coming from PLUS Expressway.

Commemorative events

Postage stamps
The commemorative postage stamps to mark the opening of the Sultan Abdul Halim Muadzam Shah Bridge on 1 March 2014 was issued by Pos Malaysia on 31 December 2014. The denominations for these stamps were RM 1.20.

Bridge in popular culture
 The Sultan Abdul Halim Muadzam Shah Bridge (Penang Second Bridge) was featured in an episode of Megastructures on the National Geographic Channel and TV1.

See also
 Penang Bridge
 Penang
 List of bridges by length
 Malaysian National Projects

References

External links
 Jambatan Kedua Sdn Bhd (JKSB)
 Sultan Abdul Halim Mu'adzam Shah Bridge Map

2014 establishments in Malaysia
Northern Corridor Economic Region
Cable-stayed bridges in Malaysia
Box girder bridges
Expressways in Malaysia
Expressways and highways in Penang
Toll bridges in Malaysia
Bridges in Penang